The Pakistan cricket team toured Australia for a 3-match Test series, a 5-match ODI series, and 1 Twenty20 International from 19 December 2009 to 5 February 2010.

During the final ODI match, the stand-in captain, Shahid Afridi, was involved in an alleged ball tampering incident, when he was seen biting the cricket ball. He was immediately called by the match referee after the match was over. There Afridi pleaded guilty to ball tampering and he was banned from two Twenty20 Internationals.

During the Twenty20 International, Australian fast bowler Shaun Tait bowled the fastest delivery ever recorded in Australia (160.7 km/h). Tait achieved the feat on the second ball of his first over. It is also the third fastest delivery ever recorded behind Brett Lee and Shoaib Akhtar.

Australia registered a clean sweep by winning the Test series 3–0, the ODI series 5–0 and the only T20.

During the tour, speculation was rife that captain Mohammad Yousuf was involved in a power struggle with former skippers Younis Khan and Shoaib Malik and that team morale was low.

Following the tour, the Pakistan Cricket Board conducted an inquiry and announced that Yousuf and Younis would not be selected for the country in future, implying a life exclusion, and banned Malik and Rana Naved-ul-Hasan for a year each. Afridi and the brothers Umar and Kamran Akmal were all fined and put on probation for six months. Kamran had been dropped after the second Test because of a string of dropped catches, but spoke out against the decision and insisted that he was not dropped, while Umar was accused of disruption by feigning injury in an attempt to go on strike in solidarity.

Squads

Tour matches

3-day tour match: Tasmania v Pakistanis - 19–21 December

Test series

1st Test

2nd Test

At an inquiry after the series was completed, the management of the Pakistan team testified that they suspected that some of the Pakistan team conspired with bookmakers in match-fixing events during this match. Pakistani wicket-keeper Kamran Akmal missed four catches and a run-out in the Australian second innings as Australia turned around a substantial first innings deficit to win the Test. However, the Australian captain Michael Clarke stated that he "certainly had no suspicions". Several months later, Mazhar Majeed a man who had accepted a bribe to provide information about spot-fixing during Pakistan's summer tour of England, stated that the match had been fixed and that the fixers had made more than a million pounds as a result of Pakistan's loss from a commanding position. There has been no other corroboration of Majeed's statements.

3rd Test

ODI series

1st ODI

2nd ODI

3rd ODI

4th ODI

5th ODI

Twenty20 International series

Media coverage

Television
Sky Sports (live) (HD) – United Kingdom and Ireland
Star Cricket (live) – India
ESPN (live) – India (3rd Test & few ODI's)
Fox Sports (live) (HD) – Australia
SKY Sport (live) (HD) – New Zealand
Geo Super (live) – Pakistan
PTV Home (live) – Pakistan
Supersport (live) – South Africa
Nine Network (live) – Australia
Eurosport (live) – Europe
DirecTV (live) – USA
Caribbean Media Corporation (live) – Barbados, Trinidad & Tobago and Antigua
StarHub (pay per view) – Malaysia and Singapore
ShowSports (live) – Middle East

Radio
ABC Radio (live) – Australia
Humara FM 94.6 (live) – Pakistan

References

External links
 Pakistan in Australia 2009/10  from Cricketarchive

2009 in cricket
2010 in cricket
2009 in Australian cricket
2010 in Australian cricket
Aus
Aus
2009–10 Australian cricket season
2009-10
International cricket competitions in 2009–10